The Mind's Eye was a publisher which produced dramatized adaptations of various written works, most notably the 1979 National Public Radio radio drama version of J.R.R. Tolkien's The Lord of the Rings and in 1980, The Hobbit. Prominent players include Bernard Mayes, Erik Bauersfeld, John Vickery, Lou Bliss, Gail Chugg, Tom Luce, Ray Reinhardt, James Arrington, Pat Franklyn, Wanda McCaddon, Rick Cimino, Joe Gostanian, John Joss, Karen Hurley, Kevin Gardiner, Darryl Ferreira, and Carl Hague. The company was acquired by Soundelux in 1992.

List of Mind's Eye productions
Many of the productions were adapted and directed by Bob Lewis, and include:

Alice in Wonderland by Lewis Carroll (1972)
Alice Through the Looking Glass by Lewis Carroll (1972)
Beauty and the Beast by Mme. De Villeneuve (1975)
The Bride Comes to Yellow Sky by Stephen Crane (1972)
The Cask of Amontillado by Edgar Allan Poe
The Celebrated Jumping Frog by Mark Twain (1972)
A Christmas Carol by Charles Dickens (1972)
Dr. Heidegger's Experiment by Nathaniel Hawthorne
Dr. Jekyll & Mr. Hyde by Robert Louis Stevenson (1973)
The Fall of the House of Usher by Edgar Allan Poe
The Gold Bug by Edgar Allan Poe
Great Expectations by Charles Dickens
The Hobbit by JRR Tolkien (1980)
The Hound of the Baskervilles by Sir Arthur Conan Doyle (1975)
Huckleberry Finn by Mark Twain  (1974)
The Invisible Man by H.G. Wells (1983)
The Legend of Sleepy Hollow by Washington Irving (1972)
The Light Princess by George MacDonald (1979)
Lord of the Rings by JRR Tolkien (1979)
The Merry Adventures of Robin Hood by Howard Pyle (1974)
Metamorphosis by Franz Kafka
Mr. Higginbotham's Catastrophe by Nathaniel Hawthorne
My Kinsman, Major Molineux by Nathaniel Hawthorne
Pinocchio by Carlo Collodi
The Time Machine by H.G. Wells (1973)
Treasure Island by Robert Louis Stevenson (1972)
The Wind in the Willows by Kenneth Grahame (1979)
The Wizard of Oz by L. Frank Baum
Young Goodman Brown by Nathaniel Hawthorne
Aladdin by Antoine Galland (1974) with James Arrington as Aladdin, Beverlee Cochrane as Scheherezade, Lynn Preisler as the Mother, Joe Hughes as the Sultan, and Joe Gostanian as the Vizier
A Connecticut Yankee in King Arthur's Court by Mark Twain
The Odyssey by Homer (1977)
Oedipus The King by Sophocles (1977)
Dracula by Bram Stoker (1983)
Watership Down by Richard Adams (1984)

References

Audiobook companies and organizations
American radio dramas
Theatre production companies